Sorin Vlaicu (born 3 May 1965) is a retired Romanian international footballer.

Club career
He started his career in 1987 in Politehnica Timișoara, where he spent most of his career. Soon he began to show himself as a very strong offensive midfielder. After becoming an international player, he was brought in 1992 by the 1991 European Champions Red Star Belgrade from Yugoslavia. In 1993, he returned to Timișoara where he continued playing until January 1995, when he moved to Hungary to play with Békéscsaba Elöre, where he played until January 1996. Since then, he has been the pillar of the Politehnica Timișoara team, having, in total, played an impressive 288 games, and scored 29 goals.

International career
After becoming an important Politehnica player, in the years of 1991 and 1992, he got four caps for the Romania national football team. His debut was on 17 April 1991 under coach Mircea Rădulescu against Spain when he came as a substitute and replaced Gheorghe Hagi in the 61st minute in a friendly which ended with a 2–0 victory against Spain.

Honours
Politehnica Timișoara
Divizia B: 1988–89
Cupa României runner-up:  1991–92
Red Star Belgrade
FR Yugoslav Cup: 1992–93
UM Timișoara
Divizia B: 2000–01

References

External sources
 

Living people
1965 births
People from Mehedinți County
Romanian footballers
Romania international footballers
Romanian expatriate footballers
Association football midfielders
FC Politehnica Timișoara players
Red Star Belgrade footballers
Békéscsaba 1912 Előre footballers
FC Drobeta-Turnu Severin players
FC CFR Timișoara players
Liga I players
Liga II players
Liga III players
Nemzeti Bajnokság I players
Expatriate footballers in Serbia and Montenegro
Expatriate footballers in Hungary
Romanian expatriate sportspeople in Serbia and Montenegro